The compound of five icosahedra is uniform polyhedron compound. It's composed of 5 icosahedra, rotated around a common axis. It has icosahedral symmetry Ih.

The triangles in this compound decompose into two orbits under action of the symmetry group: 40 of the triangles lie in coplanar pairs in icosahedral planes, while the other 60 lie in unique planes.

Cartesian coordinates 
Cartesian coordinates for the vertices of this compound are all the cyclic permutations of

 (0, ±2, ±2τ)
 (±τ−1, ±1, ±(1+τ2))
 (±τ, ±τ2, ±(2τ−1))

where τ = (1+)/2 is the golden ratio (sometimes written φ).

References 
.

Polyhedral compounds